Pigeon River Fish and Wildlife Area is a protected area that covers  and is dedicated to providing hunting and fishing opportunities. The area includes  of lakes and  along the Pigeon River. It is located on Indiana State Road 3, near Mongo in Lagrange County, Indiana.  The Fish and Wildlife Area contains Tamarack Bog Nature Preserve, a  wetland parcel that has been designated as a National Natural Landmark.

Wildlife
During the spring and fall migrations, waterfowl are at their peak abundance.  The area is open during the appropriate hunting seasons, and trapping in the wetlands is allowed but subject to selection through a drawing.

Facilities
Wildlife Viewing
Picnicking
Ice Fishing
Hunting
Trapping
Shooting Range
Archery Range
Dog Training Area
Boat Ramp (electric trolling motors only)
Dump Station
Primitive Camping (44 sites)

References

Parks in Indiana
Protected areas of LaGrange County, Indiana
Protected areas of Steuben County, Indiana
National Natural Landmarks in Indiana